WBRW (105.3 MHz) is a commercial FM radio station licensed to Blacksburg, Virginia, and serving the New River Valley and part of the Roanoke metropolitan area.  It broadcasts an active rock radio format known as "The Bear."  It is owned by Monticello Media LLC, with radio studios and offices on Lee Highway (U.S. Route 11) in Radford.  WBRW carries the nationally syndicated drive time show, Rover's Morning Glory from WMMS Cleveland.  It also carries Virginia Tech Hokies football games.

WBRW has an effective radiated power (ERP) of 12,000 watts.  The transmitter is on Stroubles Creek Road in Blacksburg.

History
The station signed on the air in   It was the FM counterpart to WJJJ 1260 AM.  The original call sign was WVVV and its frequency was 104.9 MHz.  The owner was Blacksburg-Christiansburg Broadcasters and it aired a Album Rock radio format.  

In 1996, WVVV moved to its current dial position after changing its call letters the previous year to WVMJ.  In 1999, the station switched to its current call sign, WBRW, flipping to an active rock format.

WBRW had been owned and operated by Cumulus Media. On September 6, 2018, Cumulus Media announced it would sell its Blacksburg cluster to Monticello Media. The sale was approved December 1, 2018.

References

External links
 105.3 The Bear Online
 

1964 establishments in Virginia
Active rock radio stations in the United States
Radio stations established in 1964
BRW